Batman University (Turkish: Batman Üniversitesi) is one of the 17 new universities established with "Law on Amendments to the Statements Attached to the Law on the Organization of Institutes of Higher Education, to the Statutory Decree on Academic Faculty Members of Institutes of Higher Education, and to the Statutory Decree on General Faculty and Procedure" number 5662 and approved by then President Ahmet Necdet Sezer on May 28, 2007. It is located in Batman, Turkey.

In January 2017, President Recep Tayyip Erdoğan appointed Aydın Durmuş rector of the university. Durmuş was replaced by İdris Demir in February 2021.

History 
Batman University was founded on May 28, 2007, with Additional Article 88 of Law on Amendments to the Statements Attached to the Law on the Organization of Institutes of Higher Education, to the Statutory Decree on Academic Faculty Members of Institutes of Higher Education, and to the Statutory Decree on General Faculty and Procedure number 5662.

The Batman Vocational School of Higher Education was established in affiliation with the Ministry of National Education Bureau of Universal and Formal Institutes of Higher Education during the 1975–1976 academic year and was merged with Dicle University in 1982 with Statutory Decree number 41. The institution assumed the name Batman University in 2007, separating from Dicle University, and was managed by proxy through the İnönü University rector.

Batman University attained its self-governance on September 9, 2008, with the appointment of Prof. Dr. Abdüsselam Uluçam as rector. The current rector, Aydın Durmuş, was appointed on January 22, 2017, and the university opened the Kozluk, Hasankeyf, and Sason campuses, in addition to the existing Central and West Raman campuses, for the 2018–2019 academic year.

The university has seven faculties, three institutes, four colleges, seven vocational schools, and 12 research centers. Serving approximately 15,000 students at these units of the university are 395 faculty members and 294 administrative personnel.

References

External links
Official Website

Universities and colleges in Turkey
Educational institutions established in 2007
State universities and colleges in Turkey
2007 establishments in Turkey
Batman, Turkey